Tawwaj, Tawwaz or Tavvaz was a medieval city in Fars (Pars) in modern Iran, located southwest of Shiraz.

Description
Its site has not been identified. It has been associated with the Taoke mentioned by the classical Greek historian Arrian, which was located on the bank of the Granis River and close to a Persian royal residence. However, it has also been associated with the Achaemenid site of Tamukkan; the finding of a ruined Achaemenid bastion near Borazjan supports this theory. According to the Middle Persian geography text Šahrestānīhā ī Ērānšahr, the city (called ) was founded by the Kayanid queen Humay Chehrzad, a daughter of king Kay Bahman, who is identified with the fifth Achaemenid monarch Artaxerxes I.

During the Sasanian and early Islamic period it served as an important commercial center. Tawwaj thereafter became Uthman's headquarters during his military campaigns against the Sasanians in Fars. A mosque was built in the town from that period, but had been completely ruined by the lifetime of the Persian geographer Hamdallah Mustawfi (1281–1349).

The 10th-century Persian geographer Istakhri describes Tawwaj as located in a lowland gorge with numerous date palms, a considerably hot climate and being close in size to the Fars town of Arrajan. It was major trade center, well known for its gold-embroidered, woven carpets. He reports that the town was populated by Arabs from Syria brought by the Buyid ruler Adud al-Dawla. By the 12th century, most of the town fell into ruins, and by the 14th century it was in a total ruinous state.

References

Bibliography

 

Former populated places in Fars Province
Sasanian cities
Historical geography of Fars